Hong Chengchou (1593–1665), courtesy name Yanyan and art name Hengjiu, was a Chinese official who served under the Ming and Qing dynasties. He was born in present-day Liangshan Village, Yingdu Town, Fujian Province, China. After obtaining the position of a jinshi (進士; successful candidate) in the imperial examination in 1616 during the reign of the Wanli Emperor, he joined the civil service of the Ming Empire and served as an official in Shaanxi. During the reign of the Chongzhen Emperor (r. 1627–1644), he was promoted to Minister of War and Viceroy of Suliao (薊遼; an area which included parts of present-day Shandong, Hebei and Tianjin). In 1642, he surrendered and defected to the Manchu-led Qing Empire after his defeat at the Battle of Songjin. He became one of the Qing Empire's leading Han Chinese scholar-politicians. While he was in office, he encouraged the Manchu rulers to adopt Han Chinese culture and provided advice to the Qing government on how to consolidate its control over the former territories of the fallen Ming Empire. Apart from Dorgon and Fan Wencheng, Hong Chengchou was regarded as one of the most influential politicians in the early Qing dynasty. However, he was also villainised by the Han Chinese for his defection to the Qing Empire and for his suppression of the Southern Ming dynasty (a short-lived state formed by remnants of the fallen Ming Empire).

Life

Service under the Ming Empire
Hong Chengchou started his career under the Ming Empire by leading military campaigns against rebels in the 1620s. Like Yuan Chonghuan, Xu Guangqi, Sun Yuanhua and other Ming generals, he was also a leading military strategist and proponent of the adoption of European cannons by the Ming armies. He served as the Governor of Shaanxi and Sanbian and was responsible for countering rebel forces led by Li Zicheng. He defeated Li Zicheng at the Battle of Tongguan Nanyuan in 1638, after which Li fled with only 18 men. After that battle, he was transferred to the northern border to counter invaders from the Manchu-led Qing Empire.

Battle of Shanhai Pass

The Qing raids into Ming territory brought them treasure, food and livestock, but the logistical difficulties along the circuitous invasion route through the Inner Mongolian deserts (in order to bypass the Ming garrisons of Shanhai Pass, Ningyuan, and Jinzhou along the Bohai littoral) made it difficult for the Qing forces to hold onto their territorial conquests.

The Shanhai Pass corridor remained the best invasion route for the Qing forces and therefore the Qing emperor, Huang Taiji, needed to eliminate those Ming fortresses, the first one being Jinzhou. To save the vital fortress, the Ming imperial court sent an army of over 130,000 men under Hong Chengchou to lift the siege. Unfortunately, in a series of skirmishes, Qing forces defeated the Ming army. First, Qing cavalry raided the Ming's granary in the rear, and when the Ming army retreated after it ran out of food, Huang Taiji placed ambush forces along the Ming army's retreat routes and massacred the retreating Ming soldiers at night.

Hong Chengchou surrendered to the Qing regime in 1642, after being captured in the Battle of Songjin. Prior to his surrender, he was the Governor-General of northeastern Zhili and Liaodong. He was attempting to assist the Ming general Zu Dashou, who was besieged in the city of Jinzhou. Hong Chengchou was assigned to the Chinese bordered yellow banner. A fake report of his death reached the Ming ruler, the Chongzhen Emperor, who ordered a temple be built to honour him.

Hong Chengchou's capture was the third big disaster for the Ming military since the execution of Yuan Chonghuan, and the defection of Geng Zhongming and Shang Kexi to the Qing forces (which also led to the execution of Sun Yuanhua as a scapegoat).

Service under the Qing Empire
After his surrender, Hong Chengchou was made an official only after Qing forces occupied the Ming capital, Beijing. In 1645, Hong Chengchou was sent to Nanjing with the title Pacificator of Jiangnan. His real role in the military was to ship supplies, nonetheless he suppressed many Ming officials and members of the imperial family of the Southern Ming (a short-lived state formed by remnants of the fallen Ming Empire).

Hong Chengchou was several times accused of having secret relations with the Ming remnants. He was in 1651 chastised for sending his mother back to Fujian and in 1652 was not allowed to return to Fujian to mourn his mother's death. Although he was appointed Governor-General of the five provinces of Huguang, Guangdong, Guangxi, Yunnan and Guizhou, his real task again was to provide for the Qing army.

In 1659, he was recalled to Beijing after he declined to press the war in Yunnan to capture the Yongli Emperor of Southern Ming, who had fled to Burma. Wu Sangui, who was previously one of Hong Chengchou's lieutenants and the commander of the Ming garrison at Ningyuan, was ordered to replace Hong Chengchou to continue the attack on Southern Ming forces.

Hong Chengchou was given a minor hereditary rank perhaps due to distrust by some quarters of the Qing imperial court, which suspected him of sympathising with the Ming remnants.

Hong Chenghou was transferred directly to the Manchu Bordered Yellow Banner eight years after he was put into the Eight Banners. He died shortly after requesting permission to retire because of old age and almost total blindness. He died of natural causes in Nan'an, Fujian in 1665. The location of his tomb is unknown.

References

 Zhao, Erxun et al. Draft History of Qing, Volume 237.
 The Life and Career of Hung Ch'eng-Ch'ou, 1593–1665: Public Service in a Time of Dynastic Change (Monograph and Occasional Paper Series) 

1593 births
1665 deaths
Ming dynasty generals
Qing dynasty politicians from Fujian
Grand Secretaries of the Qing dynasty
Political office-holders in Shaanxi
Political office-holders in Liaoning
Politicians from Quanzhou
Generals from Fujian
Viceroys of Huguang
Viceroys of Shaan-Gan
Viceroys of Yun-Gui